The Afro-Hispanic Review is an English-Spanish bilingual peer-reviewed academic journal published by Vanderbilt University's Department of Spanish and Portuguese and Bishop Joseph Johnson Black Cultural Center. The journal focuses on promoting the study of Afro-Latino literature and culture, both in the United States and internationally. Published twice annually, it has been described as the "premier literary journal in Afro-Hispanic studies." Its editor is the Vanderbilt professor William Luis.

The journal was founded in January 1982 at Howard University, with Stanley Cyrus as its founding editor. Beginning in 1986, it was published at the University of Missouri, as a collaboration between the departments of Black studies and Romance languages. It was transferred to Vanderbilt and its Bishop Joseph Johnson Black Cultural Center in 2005.

References

External links 
 Official website

Latin American studies journals
Black studies publications
Publications established in 1982
Biannual journals
Multilingual journals
1982 establishments in the United States